Phyllonorycter carpini is a moth of the family Gracillariidae. It is known from Japan (Hokkaidō) and the Russian Far East.

The wingspan is 5.5-6.5 mm. This species is represented by the aestival (summer) and autumnal forms, which are distinctive in colour.

The larvae feed on Carpinus cordata, Carpinus laxiflora and Carpinus tschonoskii. They mine the leaves of their host plant. The mine has the form of a ptychonomous, very elongate blotch mine on the under side of the leaf.

References

carpini
Moths of Asia

Moths of Japan
Taxa named by Tosio Kumata
Moths described in 1963
Leaf miners